Hacılar (also, Gadzhylar and Gadzhilar) is a village and municipality in the Gadabay Rayon of Azerbaijan.  It has a population of 2,156.  The municipality consists of the villages of Hacılar, Qaravəlilər, Əyridərə, Sonalar, and Məmmədcəfərli.

References 

Populated places in Gadabay District